Oscar Lafayette Jones (October 22, 1879 – June 16, 1953), nicknamed "Flip Flop", was a professional baseball pitcher in the Major Leagues from 1903 to 1905 for the Brooklyn Superbas.

External links

1879 births
1953 deaths
Major League Baseball pitchers
Baseball players from Missouri
Brooklyn Superbas players
Oakland Oaks (baseball) players
Great Falls Indians players
Los Angeles Angels (minor league) players
St. Joseph Saints players
Los Angeles (minor league baseball) players
Portland Browns players
Seattle Siwashes players
San Francisco Seals (baseball) players
Fresno Raisin Growers players
Santa Cruz Sand Crabs players
Fresno Tigers players
Visalia Pirates players
Lemoore Cubs players
Stockton Producers players
Portland Colts players
Ballard Pippins players
Tacoma Tigers players
Vancouver Beavers players